Aphaenops jeanneli is a species of beetle in the subfamily Trechinae. It was described by Abeille de Perrin in 1905.

References

jeanneli
Beetles described in 1905
Taxa named by Elzéar Abeille de Perrin